Admiral Sir Alan Geoffrey Hotham,  (3 October 1876 – 10 July 1965) was an officer in the Royal Navy. He also played first-class cricket for Hampshire in 1901.

Naval career
Born the son of Admiral of the Fleet Sir Charles Hotham, Hotham was born in Edinburgh, Midlothian on 3 October 1876 and played first-class cricket for Hampshire in 1901.

By then a Lieutenant, he was in September 1902 posted as a gunnery officer to the protected cruiser HMS Isis, based at Dartmouth. He served during the First World War, commanding the C-class light cruiser  at the Battle of Jutland. He was appointed Director of Trade at the Admiralty in 1917 and Commodore Commanding the New Zealand Division in 1921 before serving as Director of Naval Intelligence at the Admiralty from 1924 to 1927. He retired from the navy in 1929 and became a member of Port of London Authority. Hotham was Gentleman Usher of the Blue Rod between 1934 and 1959. In this capacity he was present at the Coronation of Queen Elizabeth II in 1953.

He died in Victoria, London on 10 July 1965 at the age of 88.

References

|-

|-

1876 births
1965 deaths
New Zealand military personnel
Royal Navy admirals
Knights Commander of the Order of St Michael and St George
Companions of the Order of the Bath
Hampshire cricketers
English cricketers of 1890 to 1918
Military personnel from Edinburgh
Scottish cricketers
Devon cricketers
Directors of Naval Intelligence
Royal Navy officers of World War I
People from Victoria, London
Cricketers from Edinburgh